Sander Tangvik (born 29 November 2002) is a Norwegian footballer who plays as a goalkeeper for Norwegian club Rosenborg.

Club career

In March 2021 Tangvik signed a new contract with Rosenborg and became a part of the first team squad. Later that year in August he made his debut against Orkla in the Norwegian Cup, coming on for the second half. 

Tangvik made his league debut on 6 November 2022 coming on in the 89th minute against Jerv, replacing André Hansen.

Career statistics

Club

References

External links
 

2002 births
Living people
Norwegian footballers
Association football goalkeepers
Rosenborg BK players
Eliteserien players